Sarah Burns (born 1981) is an American actress.

Sarah Burns may also refer to:

Sarah Burns (writer filmmaker), The Central Park Five

Sarah Burns (Splinter Cell), video game character

See also 

Sarah Byrnes, character in the book Staying Fat for Sarah Byrnes